Ochoco may refer to the following places in the U.S. State of Oregon:

 Ochoco Mountains, a mountain range in the central part of the state
 Ochoco National Forest, a National Forest within the Ochoco Mountains
 Ochoco Creek, a creek in the Ochoco Mountains
 Ochoco Dam, a dam along Ochoco Creek
 Ochoco Highway, a highway that passes through the Ochoco Mountains
 Ochoco State Scenic Viewpoint, a state park located in the Ochoco Mountains
 Ochoco Summit, a mountain pass traversed by the Ochoco Highway in the Ochoco Mountains
 Ochoco West, Oregon, a census-designated place at the western foot of the Ochoco Mountains